Riverdale station (also known as Riverdale–West 254th Street station) is a commuter rail stop on the Metro-North Railroad's Hudson Line, serving the Riverdale neighborhood of the Bronx, New York City. The Riverdale station, located at the foot of West 254th Street, is the northernmost Metro-North station in the Bronx. As of August 2006, daily commuter ridership was 543 and there were 153 parking spaces.

History
The former New York Central Railroad depot at the location burned down on the morning of June 23, 1982, after a suspicious fire, requiring two trains to bypass the station.

Under the 2015–2019 Metropolitan Transportation Authority Capital Plan, the station, along with four other Metro-North Railroad stations, received a complete overhaul as part of the Enhanced Station Initiative. Updates included cellular service, Wi-Fi, USB charging stations, interactive service advisories, and maps. The renovations at Riverdale station cost $9.5 million and were completed by the end of September 2018.

Station layout

The station has two high-level, side platforms, each eight cars long. An additional track is located west of the southbound platform, but is not powered nor used. Just south of the station are switches that allow Empire Corridor trains to diverge to Pennsylvania Station via the Empire Connection and Spuyten Duyvil Bridge.

Next to the station's southbound platform lies the Riverdale Waterfront Promenade and Fishing Access Site.

References

External links 

 Entrance from Google Maps Street View
 Platforms from Google Maps Street View

Metro-North Railroad stations in New York City
Former New York Central Railroad stations
Riverdale, Bronx
Railway stations in the Bronx